Grégoire Blanc (born in 1996) is a French musician who plays the theremin and the musical saw.

Biography

Early life 
Born in Paris, he began studying cello at the age of four alongside other musical instruments.

At the age of 15, he heard about the theremin in high school and developed a passion for the instrument. Encouraged to work on a playing technique by his cello teacher, he then published a few videos on YouTube which attracted the attention of a wide audience. In 2013, a video of him performing Debussy's Clair de Lune garnered more than 3 million views. Meeting renowned thereminists such as Carolina Eyck and Lydia Kavina, helped him to go a step further.

He graduated from École nationale supérieure d'arts et métiers in 2018. A year later, he decided to devote himself entirely to his musical career.

Musical style 
As a classically trained musician, Blanc aims to contribute to legitimate the theremin, to "get audiences to appreciate the theremin’s tones as music, and not just a curiosity". He also mentioned his will to escape from the classical repertoire.

He frequently works with pianists, orchestras and even organists in public performances and over the internet. His tallness and long fingers give him a style and a precision suitable for the practice of theremin.

In 2020, he was involved in the development of a brand new model of theremin with Moog Music alongside Dorit Chrysler and Pamelia Stickney.

In 2022, he released «À ses derniers pas, entrant dans la boue», an album of new music for theremin, piano and continuum fingerboard by Canadian composer Aleks Schürmer.  The album, released on the Canadian Music Centre's label, Centredisc represents Blanc's first recital album.

Discography

Album 

 New York Theremin Society – Theremin 100 (2020)
 Aleks Schürmer – À ses derniers pas, entrant dans la boue (2022)

Film music 
Source : Internet Movie Database

 Holy Beasts (2019)
 Es war einmal in Deutschland... (2017)
 Ondes noires (2017)

References 

Living people
French classical musicians
Theremin players
21st-century classical musicians
1996 births